The Selected Journals of L. M. Montgomery, Vol. I–V, are the personal journals of famed Canadian author, Lucy Maud Montgomery (1874–1942).

Originally, Montgomery had bequeathed all of her journals and scrapbooks to her son, Dr. E. Stuart Macdonald. Macdonald held onto those journals and scrapbooks until 1981, when he donated them to the University of Guelph in Ontario, Canada.  Mary Rubio, and Elizabeth Waterston, of the University of Guelph, co-edited all five volumes of these journals. Rubio and Waterston edited these volumes from 1985–2004.

Summary
Until recently, Montgomery's readers had only a limited understanding of her personal life. Some surmised that Emily of New Moon was the closest to an autobiography that Montgomery's readers would ever get. Then, in 1985, the first edition of The Selected Journals of L.M. Montgomery Vol. I: 1889–1910 was published by the Oxford University Press in Canada. In 1987, Volume II: 1910–1921, and in 1992, Volume III: 1921–1929, was published. Volume IV: 1929–1935 was published in 1998, and Volume V: 1935–1942, was published in 2004.

Publication

Unpublished Journal
There are many omissions of her journal entries.
Unpublished journals are archived in University of Guelph and Looking for Anne quotes from unpublished journal entries.

References
 Montgomery, L. M. (1985). The selected journals of L.M. Montgomery: Volume I: 1889–1910 (Rubio, M. & Waterston, E.). Oxford University Press: Toronto.
 Oxford University Press, Canada. Retrieved July 6, 2007.
 The Reading Well and Bohemian Literary Café. Retrieved July 6, 2007.
 University of Guelph. Retrieved July 6, 2007.

Notes

External links
 Elizabeth Waterston
 L.M. Montgomery Online – this scholarly site includes a blog, an extensive bibliography of reference materials, and a complete filmography of all adaptations of Montgomery texts.
 The L. M. Montgomery Literary Society – this site  includes information about Montgomery's works and life and research from the newsletter, The Shining Scroll.

Books by Lucy Maud Montgomery
Diaries